Independent Macedonia may refer to:
 North Macedonia, a country in Southeastern Europe, independent since 1991
 Macedonian nationalism, an ideology associated with the will for national independence of the Macedonian ethnic group
 Independent Macedonia (IMRO), a concept developed by the Internal Macedonian Revolutionary Organization during the interwar period (1918-1939)
 Independent Macedonia (1944), a proposed puppet state of Nazi Germany in present-day North Macedonia
 Independent Macedonia (sport hall), a multi-sports arena in Skopje, North Macedonia

See also 
 Macedonia (disambiguation)
 Macedonia (region) for the wider area
 Macedonian Struggle (ca. 1893-1908), the conflict for the independence of the wider Macedonian region from the Ottoman Empire
 Autonomy for Macedonia and Adrianople regions, a related political concept in Ottoman Macedonia